Chan Pancharut (born 26 May 1942) is a Thai former sports shooter. He competed in the 300 metre rifle event at the 1964 Summer Olympics.

References

1942 births
Living people
Chan Pancharut
Chan Pancharut
Shooters at the 1964 Summer Olympics
Place of birth missing (living people)